Robert Richard Boyd (October 1, 1919 – September 7, 2004) was an American first baseman in the Negro leagues and Major League Baseball.

Career
Nicknamed "Rope" for his line-drive hitting, Boyd served in the US Army during World War II, and played in the Negro leagues with the Memphis Red Sox (1947–49), and in the major leagues for the Chicago White Sox (1951, 1953–54), Baltimore Orioles (1956–60), Kansas City Athletics (1961) and Milwaukee Braves (1961).

The ,  Boyd threw and batted left-handed, and he could shine with his glove. He was a contact hitter, slight of frame, and did not produce the kind of home run power expected from a major league first baseman. He started his professional career in the Negro leagues with the Memphis Red Sox, and played three seasons for them between 1947 and 1949, batting .352, .369 and .371, respectively.

In 1950, Boyd became the first black player to sign with the Chicago White Sox. He made his debut on September 8, 1951. Basically a backup player and pinch-hitter with the Sox, in 1954 he was sent to the St. Louis Cardinals, but did not play for them, spending 1954 and 1955 with Houston in the Double-A Texas League and hitting .321 and .310. At the end of the 1955 season, he was drafted by the Baltimore Orioles from St. Louis in the Rule 5 draft. In 1956 with the Orioles, he hit .311 with two homers and 11 RBI in 70 games.

Boyd enjoyed a career season in 1957. Only eight batters reached the .300 mark in the American League, and he finished fourth in the batting race with a .318 average behind Ted Williams (.388), Mickey Mantle (.365) and Gene Woodling (.321), and over Nellie Fox, Minnie Miñoso, Bill Skowron and Roy Sievers. Beside this, Boyd became the first Oriole regular in the 20th century to hit over .300 in batting average. The following year, he batted .309 with a career-high seven home runs.

Boyd ended his majors career in 1961. He compiled a .293 batting average with 19 home runs and 175 RBI in 693 games. Thanks to his discipline at the plate and knowledge of the strike zone, he registered an outstanding 1.465 walk-to-strikeout ratio (167-to-114). At first base, he committed only 36 errors in 4159 chances for a .991 fielding average.

Bob Boyd died at age 84 in Wichita, Kansas. He is a member both of the Negro League Hall of Fame and of the National Baseball Congress Hall of Fame. His nephew Dennis "Oil Can" Boyd pitched for three MLB teams, most notably the Boston Red Sox, between 1982 and 1991.

See also
 List of Negro league baseball players
 List of Negro league baseball players who played in Major League Baseball

Sources
 Interview with Bob Boyd
 Negro League Baseball Players Association
 National Baseball Congress Hall of Fame
 Bob Boyd - Baseballbiography.com
 Retrosheet Official Web Page

References

External links
 and Seamheads 
 

1919 births
2004 deaths
African Americans in World War II
Baltimore Orioles players
Baseball players from Mississippi
Charleston Senators players
Chicago White Sox players
Colorado Springs Sky Sox (WL) players
Deaths from cancer in Kansas
Houston Buffaloes players
Kansas City Athletics players
Louisville Colonels (minor league) players
Major League Baseball first basemen
Memphis Red Sox players
Milwaukee Braves players
Oklahoma City 89ers players
People from Marshall County, Mississippi
Sacramento Solons players
San Antonio Bullets players
Seattle Rainiers players
Baseball players from Wichita, Kansas
Toronto Maple Leafs (International League) players
United States Army personnel of World War II
21st-century African-American people
African-American United States Army personnel